The following is a lead of the head coaches of the Wisconsin Badgers football, which represent the University of Wisconsin–Madison. The Badgers have competed in the Big Ten Conference since its formation in 1896.

Head coaching history

Updated on: November 27, 2020 (Updated through 2019 season)
All Data from The Wisconsin Football Fact Book

References

Wisconsin Badgers

Wisconsin Badgers football coaches